Mynes eucosmetos is a medium-sized butterfly of the family Nymphalidae endemic to the Bismarck Archipelago.

Subspecies
M. e eucosmetos  New Hanover
M. e. cottonis  Grose-Smith, 1894  New Britain

References

 

Nymphalini
Butterflies described in 1879
Taxa named by Frederick DuCane Godman
Taxa named by Osbert Salvin